Prince Masino Bonkat (born 22 May 1996) is a Nigerian football player who plays for Fontinhas.

Club career
He made his professional debut in the Segunda Liga for Vizela on 14 January 2017 in a game against Académico de Viseu.

References

External links
 

1996 births
Living people
Sportspeople from Kaduna
Nigerian footballers
Nigerian expatriate footballers
Expatriate footballers in Portugal
Nigerian expatriate sportspeople in Portugal
F.C. Paços de Ferreira players
Amarante F.C. players
F.C. Vizela players
C.D.C. Montalegre players
S.C. Vila Real players
S.C. Coimbrões players
Liga Portugal 2 players
Association football forwards